{{DISPLAYTITLE:C23H32O4}}

The molecular formula C23H32O4 may refer to:

 Hydroxyprogesterone acetate, an orally active progestin related to hydroxyprogesterone caproate
 Norgestomet, a progestin medication which is used in veterinary medicine